Clear (stylized as xClearx) was a straight edge metalcore group from Utah in the mid-late 1990s, known for its sound similar to Culture and Morning Again. The band broke up in 2000. Mick Morris went on to Eighteen Visions, and other members Jason Knott, Levi Lebo, and Josh Asher to The Kill. Levi and Mick previously also played in Decontaminate. Sean and Tyler went on to form Hammergun. xclearx played one reunion show on February 16, 2007. In 2013 Mick Morris died prompting Clear to do a memorial show for his son. Clear played a benefit show a couple years later. Currently 2017 Jason Knott is a singer/guitarist for Motherkilljoy, Levi Lebo plays guitar for Exes, Tyler Smith drums for Eagle Twin. Other bands associated with the dis-banning of Clear are The New Transit Direction, Form of Rocket, and Light/Black.

Members
Final lineup
 Jason Knott - Vocals
 Mick Morris - Guitar (died 2013)
 Josh Asher - Guitar
 Sean McClaugherty - Bass
 Tyler Smith - Drums

Previous members
 Dave Anderson - Guitar
 Levi Lebo - Guitar
 Julie Jensen - Guitar
 Jim Dieckman - Guitar

Discography
 The Sickness Must End - Life Sentence Records (1996)
 Deeper Than Blood - Stillborn Records  (1999)

External links
 Interview with Clear

Straight edge groups
Metalcore musical groups from Utah
Musical groups from Utah
Musical groups disestablished in 2000
Musical groups established in 1995
1995 establishments in Utah